Ignition! is a studio album by Brian Setzer released in 2001. Following fronting a swing orchestra in the 1990s, Ignition! marks Setzer's return to purist rockabilly fronting a trio, named the Brian Setzer '68 Comeback Special, in homage to 1968 TV Special of Elvis Presley.

Track listing
All tracks composed and arranged by Brian Setzer; except where indicated
 "Ignition!"
 "5 Years, 4 Months, 3 Days"
 "Hell Bent" (Setzer, Mike Himelstein)
 "Hot Rod Girl" (Setzer, Mike Himelstein)
 "8-Track"
 "'59"
 "Rooster Rock" (Setzer, Mark W. Winchester)
 "Santa Rosa Rita"
 "(The Legend of) Johnny Kool, Part 2"
 "Get 'Em on the Ropes"
 "Who Would Love This Car but Me?" (Setzer, Joe Strummer)
 "Blue Café"
 "Dreamsville"
 "Malagueña" (Traditional; arranged by Setzer)
 "Mystery Train" (Setzer, Junior Parker, Sam Phillips)
 "Gene and Eddie"
 "Rumble in Brighton"
"69 all night long"

Personnel
Brian Setzer - guitar, vocals
'68 Comeback Special
Mark W. Winchester - slap bass; lead vocals on "Rooster Rock"
Bernie Dresel - drums
with:
The Brianaires - backing vocals on "Dreamsville"

References

2001 albums
Brian Setzer albums
Surfdog Records albums